The New York Hilton Midtown is the largest hotel in New York City and world's 101st tallest hotel. The hotel is owned by Park Hotels & Resorts and managed by Hilton Worldwide. At 1,929 rooms and over 150,000 sq ft of meeting space, the hotel is the largest Hilton in the continental U.S.

The 47-floor building, north of Rockefeller Center at Sixth Avenue and 53rd Street, has hosted every U.S. president since John F. Kennedy as well as the Beatles. The world's first handheld cell phone call was made by hotel guest Martin Cooper in front of the hotel in 1973. President Donald Trump delivered his 2016 United States presidential election victory speech at the hotel.

History
The project was developed by Hilton Hotels Corporation, the Rockefeller Group, and the Uris Buildings Corporation. The original architect was Morris Lapidus and he proposed to build a curved Fontainebleau Hotel-style building. However, Lapidus had to withdraw since he was also designing the competing Americana of New York hotel a block away.

William B. Tabler was then tapped to finish the project and he designed it with slabs. It opened June 26, 1963, as the New York Hilton and offered 2,153 rooms, making it the largest in the city.

In 1990, a $100 million renovation decreased the number of guest rooms to 1,980. The property underwent further renovations in 1991–1994 and a $100 million renovation in 1998–2000 that included a complete overhaul of the lobby, the addition of an  Precor USA Fitness Center on the fifth floor. Around that time the name was changed to Hilton New York, as all Hilton hotels were rebranding the name Hilton to go before the city name at the time. In 2007, the hotel completed its fourth renovation. It now has 47 suites on floors 42 through 44.

In 2013, the hotel was renamed the New York Hilton Midtown in honor of its 50th anniversary. At that time, the management announced that it ended room service and established a new unique restaurant concept with room delivery called "Herb n' Kitchen".

Ownership of the hotel was transferred in 2017 to Park Hotels & Resorts when that company was spun off from Hilton Worldwide.

Notable events and media
Hilton Hotels & Resorts asserts that the lyrics to  John Lennon's 1971 song "Imagine" were composed in the hotel.

In June 1972, Elvis Presley stayed here while performing four sold-out concerts at nearby Madison Square Garden. He held a press conference before the first show at the Mercury Ballroom at the Hilton hotel.

Martin Cooper made the world's first handheld cellular phone call in public April 3, 1973, when he called Joel S. Engel at the New York Hilton with a two-pound Motorola DynaTAC phone. Cooper, a Motorola inventor called his rival at Bell Labs to tell him about the invention. The cell phone base station was next door atop the 1345 Avenue of the Americas.

The hotel owned the property immediately west of it which was the site of the Adelphi Theatre where episodes of The Honeymooners were filmed. The Adelphi was torn down in 1970. In 1989, an office tower, 1325 Avenue of the Americas, was built on the site. The tower is connected to the Hilton with a walkway and keeps the Hilton's Sixth Avenue address even though it is midblock and closer to Seventh Avenue. Exterior shots of Elaine's workplace at the J. Peterman Company in Seinfeld show the building.

In the 2016 United States presidential election, US President Donald J. Trump held his election night victory party in the hotel's grand ballroom.

The hotel is home to a number of award ceremonies, including the International Emmy Awards presented by the International Academy. Each Spring, the hotel serves as the venue for the Inner Circle Show, the annual charity dinner produced by New York City journalists satirizing city, state and national politics, and current events.

References

External links

New York Hilton Midtown official website

Hilton Hotels & Resorts hotels
Hotel buildings completed in 1963
Hotels established in 1963
Hotels in Manhattan
Midtown Manhattan
Sixth Avenue
Skyscraper hotels in Manhattan
1963 establishments in New York City